"The Public Square" is a poem from the second
edition (1931) of 
Wallace Stevens's first book of poetry,
Harmonium. It was first
published in 1923, so it is one of
the few poems in the collection that is not free of copyright, but it
is quoted here in full as justified by fair use for scholarly
commentary.

The violence of an edifice's demolition is matched by the violence of
the poem's language, particularly in the first two stanzas. The
slow-motion collapse is captured in the surreal atmosphere created by
the third stanza. The final stanza etches a precise image of the
square's clearing.

The harshness of the poem can be compared to the brutal encounter with
Berserk in "Anecdote of the Prince of Peacocks", with which it shares
an architectural motif.

Buttel detects the influence of Cubism.

Notes

References 
 Robert Frost. Wallace Stevens: The Making of Harmonium. 1967: Princeton University Press.
 Stevens, H. Letters of Wallace Stevens. 1966: University of California Press

1923 poems
American poems
Poetry by Wallace Stevens